Impossible (stylised as !mpossible) is a British television quiz show created by Hugh Rycroft and produced by Mighty Productions for BBC One. Hosted by Rick Edwards, the show has a maximum prize of £10,000, and features questions in which some answer choices are "impossible", or inconsistent with the given category. Episodes of Impossible are also seen in the United States on the over-the-top internet television services Plex, Xumo and The Roku Channel, with each looping episodes 24 hours a day on its own dedicated streaming channel.

Gameplay
With the exception of Round 2 (see below), all questions used on the show are multiple-choice, with at least one answer each of three different types – correct, wrong, and "impossible". The impossible answers are distinguished by being inconsistent with the premise of the question. For example, if the question were "Seoul is the capital of which Asian country?", the choices could be:

 North Korea – wrong (its capital is Pyongyang)
 South Korea – correct
 West Korea – impossible (this country does not exist)

On each episode, a pool of contestants competes through two rounds until one is left to play for either the £10,000 jackpot or a smaller daily prize pot built up during the course of the game. Contestants leave the show after playing the final once, whether they win or not. With the exception of the last episode of each series, players who fail to reach the final for any reason return on the next episode as long as they have not reached the end of their eligibility.

The size of the pool and the contestants' time on the show have occasionally changed. In the first series, 30 contestants competed across all 15 episodes. The entire pool was replaced after every ten episodes in the second and third series, and after every five from the fourth series onward. The pool was 24 contestants in the second through fourth series, and 21 in the fifth. Also, in the first series contestants left the game after they had reached the final twice, rather than once as in all subsequent series, the eighth series had 12 contestants instead of 21 due the coronavirus pandemic social distancing guidelines.

During the first three series, contestants who left the show were replaced by new ones to keep the pool at a constant size. Starting with the fourth series, though, the departing contestant is not replaced, leaving their seat empty.

The Qualifier & The Grid
This round is played three times, with each playing split into two halves, a qualifier and the grid, to choose a contestant for the final. The scores are set to zero at the beginning of each qualifier.

In the qualifier, the host asks five multiple-choice questions, each with three answer options. Contestants secretly lock in their guesses, and earn one point for each correct answer. Wrong answers leave the score unaffected, but an impossible answer or a failure to lock in a response eliminates the contestant from the game. However, if all remaining contestants are eliminated on a single question, the entire pool is brought back into play. After the fifth question, the high scorer advances to the second half; in the event of a tie, the contestant who locked in their answers in the shortest total time advances to play a grid.

For the grid, the high scorer chooses one of four categories and is shown nine answers – one correct, three wrong, five impossible. After hearing the first half of a question, they choose five answers they believe to be impossible; each successful choice adds £100 to the daily prize pot and is removed from the board. The host then reads the second half of the question, with all chosen non-impossible answers returned to play, and the contestant must choose the correct answer in order to advance to the final. Choosing a wrong answer gives the runner-up/last player who was eliminated from the first half a chance to find the right answer and advance. However, if this contestant chooses a wrong or impossible answer, the high scorer moves ahead. If any impossible answers remain on the board and the high scorer chooses one, they are eliminated and the runner-up gets a turn; if they fail to choose the correct answer, the host begins working down through the next-highest scorers until one of them does so.

Categories are removed from the list of four as they are chosen, leaving three options in the second playing and two in the third. The maximum daily prize pot is £1,500, accumulated by eliminating all five impossible answers in every playing of the grid. Contestants who advance to the final sit out all subsequent playings of the qualifier and grid.

If a qualifier begins with only one contestant left in the pool, they must still give a correct answer in order to advance to the grid.

The Final
The three remaining contestants compete directly against one another, answering a series of open-ended questions on the buzzer. Each is given 10 lives to start the round; a correct answer takes one life from both opponents, while a miss takes one from the contestant who buzzed-in. Some of the questions are themselves impossible (e.g. "In which decade of the 20th century was Pablo Picasso born?" – he was born in 1881, during the 19th century). Correctly identifying an impossible question costs both opponents two lives. However, if a contestant either tries to answer an impossible question or falsely identifies a question as impossible, they lose two lives. Contestants who lose all their lives are eliminated from the game; the last one remaining advances to the £10,000 question.

The £10,000 Question
The last remaining contestant is asked one question in a randomly chosen category and shown nine answers, three each of correct, wrong and impossible. The contestant has 10 seconds to choose three answers, and wins the £10,000 jackpot if all three are correct. They win the daily prize pot if any of their choices are wrong but none are impossible, and nothing at all if they choose an impossible answer.

During the first series, contestants who missed the question were asked a second one under the same rules. This format was dropped at the start of the second series, giving only one chance to win any money.

The format was further altered in series 4 in that the departing contestant was no longer replaced, leaving that seat empty for subsequent episodes. The batch of contestants would also stay for a week instead of two, as in previous series.

The jackpot is presented onstage as a giant exclamation mark containing 10,000 £1 coins. When a contestant wins it, a hatch in the bottom opens and the coins drain into a hopper underneath.

Impossible Celebrities
On 20 February 2018, it was announced that Impossible would be launching a primetime celebrity series, which began to air in August that year. This version follows the same rules as the regular show, with two changes:

 The pool consists of 18 celebrities, each playing for a charity of their choice.
 If a celebrity gives an impossible answer during the final, the daily prize pot is cut in half and donated to their charity.

Transmissions

Regular editions

Celebrity editions

Merchandise
The official Impossible app for iOS and Android was released by Barnstorm Games on 28 August 2019.

References

External links
 
 Impossible Celebrities on BBC Programmes
 
 

2017 British television series debuts
2021 British television series endings
2010s British game shows
2020s British game shows
BBC Scotland television shows
BBC television game shows
English-language television shows
Television series by BBC Studios